Peggy March (born Margaret Annemarie Battavio, March 8, 1948) is an American pop singer. In the United States, she is primarily known for her 1963 million-selling song "I Will Follow Him". Although she is sometimes remembered as a one-hit wonder, she continued to have success in Europe well into the 1970s.

Career 
Born to an Italian-American family, March was discovered at age 13 singing at her cousin's wedding and was introduced to record producers Hugo & Luigi.

On April 24, 1963, her single "I Will Follow Him" soared to number one on the United States charts. She recorded the song in early January 1963 and it was released on January 22, when she was only 14. March became the youngest female artist with a number-one hit, at 15, in late April 1963, a record that still stands for the Billboard Hot 100. The recording also reached number one in Australia, New Zealand, South Africa, Japan, and Scandinavia. It failed to chart in the United Kingdom. It was a translation of the French song "Chariot" recorded a year earlier by Petula Clark. March also became the first white female solo artist to hit number one on the Billboard R&B chart.

March's success also came with financial trouble. She was a minor and the "Coogan Law" prevented her parents from managing her money. The responsibility was placed on her manager, Russell Smith. It was discovered in 1966 that he had squandered the fortune, leaving her with $500. March graduated from Lansdale Catholic High School in 1966.

Although she is remembered in the United States by some as a one-hit wonder, her singles, "I Wish I Were a Princess" and "Hello Heartache, Goodbye Love". made the top 30 in the US, with the latter also reaching No. 29 on the UK Singles Chart. As with many American artists, March's career in her native country was derailed in part by the British Invasion, which at the time was pushing many American acts out of popularity, and she had no hits at home once the Invasion began in 1964. Recording for RCA Victor, March made 18 singles from 1964 to 1971. She also cut several albums, none of which sold well in the United States. She began having a strong presence in the European and Asian music markets and moved to Germany in 1969. She won the Deutscher Schlager Contest in 1965 and her song "Mit 17 hat man noch Träume" ("At 17 you still have dreams") placed No. 2 in the German Singles Chart. This was followed by German songs like "In der Carnaby Street", "Einmal verliebt – immer verliebt", "Romeo und Julia" ("On Carnaby Street", "Once in Love – Always in Love", "Romeo and Juliet" ... No. 1 in German Charts), "Der Schuster macht schöne Schuhe" ("'The Cobbler Makes Beautiful Shoes"), "Telegramm aus Tennessee", "Die Maschen der Männer" and "Das sind die Träume, die man so träumt". Her commercial success in Germany continued through much of the 1970s; she tried her luck in representing Germany in the Eurovision Song Contest in 1969, only to be placed second in the national final with the song "Hey! Das ist Musik für mich". March made another Eurovision attempt in 1975, when she performed the Ralph Siegel composition "Alles geht vorüber" in the German national contest. Again, she was placed second.

In 1979, she experimented with disco on the album Electrifying, but it failed to achieve commercial success. By 1981 EMI did not renew her contract, and she moved back to the United States. In 1984, however, Jermaine Jackson and Pia Zadora achieved a major European hit single with the track "When the Rain Begins to Fall", co-written by March. Although not a hit in the UK or in the US, it went to #1 in Germany, France, the Netherlands and Switzerland. In 1998, the song entered the German Top 10 again when covered by rapper Pappa Bear. The cult film Hairspray featured "I Wish I Were a Princess" in 1988, and a retro fad in Germany brought her some continuing success starting in the mid-1990s with the album Die Freiheit Frau zu sein (1995). Her song "I Will Follow Him" was featured in the 1992 movie Sister Act.

March currently works largely in Germany and in the Las Vegas music scene and has also performed at Dick Clark's American Bandstand Theater in Branson, Missouri. In 2004 she was the headliner in Riff Markowitz's Fabulous Palm Springs Follies at the Plaza Theater in Palm Springs, California. In 2005, she released an album of standards, Get Happy, followed by the album Meine Liebe ist stark genug (2008).

In March 2010, March went into the recording studio to record her first album of new, original material in English in over 30 years. A collaboration with Scandinavian songwriter and producer Soren Jensen, the album Always and Forever was released on October 13, 2010. It was followed by a special edition for the German-speaking countries in April 2012, including two duets with the Dutch singer José Hoebee, one of them being a cover version of "I Will Follow Him"; which had also been a number-one single in the Netherlands and Belgium for Hoebee in 1982 (March further recorded a subsequent recording in 2012 for a 2013 release to commemorate the song's 50th anniversary). March also recorded another version of "When the Rain Begins to Fall", as a duet with the German singer Andreas Zaron.

Personal life 
In 1969, March married Arnie Harris, her longtime manager. They had one daughter, Sande Ann, born in 1974. In 2013, Harris died. After living in Germany since 1969, March moved to Florida in 1999.

Discography

Singles

Albums

References

External links 
 
 fan site
 Dick Clark's American Bandstand Theater
 [ Little Peggy March biography] provided by AllMusic
 

1948 births
Living people
American people of Italian descent
American expatriates in Germany
American women pop singers
RCA Victor artists
People from Lansdale, Pennsylvania
Singers from Pennsylvania
21st-century American women